Fear is an emotion that arises from the perception of danger.

Fear or The Fear may also refer to:

People
 "Fear", an alias of Mikael Åkerfeldt's on the album The Human Equation
 "Fear", the online alias of the professional Dota 2 player Clinton Loomis
 "Fear", the lead guitarist of Mexican punk rock band Allison

Arts and entertainment

Fictional entities
 Fear, the personification of fear in the film Inside Out (2015)
 Fear, a villain in the R. L. Stine's The Haunting Hour episode "Fear Never Knocks"
 The Fear, a character from Metal Gear Solid 3: Snake Eater

Film
 Fear (1917 film), a German film directed by Robert Wiene
 Fear (1946 film), a film directed by Alfred Zeisler 
 Fear (1954 film) by Roberto Rossellini starring Ingrid Bergman
 Fear (1965 film), a short Hindi film directed by Ritwik Ghatak
 Fear (1988 film), an action film featuring Cliff DeYoung
 Fear (1990 film), a thriller/horror film starring Ally Sheedy
 Fear (1996 film), a film starring Mark Wahlberg and Reese Witherspoon
 Fear (2020 film), a Bulgarian film
 Fear (2023 film), a horror film directed by Deon Taylor
 Le Fear, a 2010 British comedy film
 The Fear (1966 film), a Greek crime drama
 The Fear (1995 film), an American horror film starring Vince Edwards
 The Fear (2015 film), a French film

Gaming
 F.E.A.R. (series), a series of psychological horror video games
 F.E.A.R. (video game) (First Encounter Assault Recon), a 2005 first-person shooter video game

Literature
 Fear (Abbot novel), a 2006 novel by Jeff Abbott
 Fear (anthology), a 2010 book edited by R. L. Stine
 Fear (comics), a comic book series published by Marvel Comics from 1970 to 1975
 Fear (Hubbard novella), a 1940 novella by L. Ron Hubbard
 Fear (Rybakov novel), a 1990 novel by Anatoly Rybakov
 Fear (Zweig novella), a 1925 novella by Stefan Zweig
 Fear: Anti-Semitism in Poland after Auschwitz, a 2006 book by Jan T. Gross
Fear: Trump in the White House, a 2018 non-fiction book by Bob Woodward
 The Fear (Higson novel), a 2011 novel in The Enemy series by Charlie Higson
 The Fear (Keneally novel), a 1965 novel by Thomas Keneally

Music
 Fear (band), an American punk band formed in 1977 in Los Angeles

Albums
 Fear (John Cale album), 1974
 Fear (EP), a 1987 EP by Klinik
 Fear (Royal Hunt album), 1999
 fear (Toad the Wet Sprocket album), 1991
 Fuck Everyone and Run (F E A R), a 2016 album by Marillion
 The Fear (album), a 1989 album by Acid Reign
 The Fear (EP), a 1999 EP by Mike Paradinas

Songs
 "Fear" (Kendrick Lamar song), 2017
 "Fear" (song series), a 1984-2002 set of four songs by Rush
 "Fear", by All Saints from Red Flag
 "Fear", by Blue October from Sway
 "Fear", by Disturbed from The Sickness
 "Fear", by James from The Morning After
 "Fear", by Jim Martin from Milk and Blood
 "Fear", by Lenny Kravitz from Let Love Rule
 "Fear", by Linkin Park from LP Underground 9: Demos
 "Fear", by Low from I Could Live in Hope
 "Fear", by Mudvayne from Kill, I Oughtta
 "Fear", by Oceansize from Leader of the Starry Skies: A Tribute to Tim Smith, Songbook 1
 "Fear", by OneRepublic from Waking Up
 "Fear", by Paradise Lost from Draconian Times or Forever Failure
 "Fear", by Sarah McLachlan from Fumbling Towards Ecstasy
 "Fear", by Sevendust from Chapter VII: Hope & Sorrow
 "Fear", a 2019 song by Seventeen from An Ode
 "Fear", by Spratleys Japs from Pony
 "Fear", by The Ventures from The Ventures in Space
"Fear", by Sia from Healing Is Difficult
 "F.E.A.R." (song), a 2001 song by Ian Brown
 "Fear (of the Unknown)", a 1991 song by Siouxsie and the Banshees
 "The Fear" (Ben Howard song), 2011
 "The Fear" (Lily Allen song), 2008
 "The Fear", by The Feelers from Playground Battle
 "The Fear", by The Levellers from Zeitgeist
 "The Fear", by Pulp from This Is Hardcore
 "The Fear", by Röyksopp from Senior
 "The Fear", by The Shins from Heartworms
 "The Fear", by Travis from The Man Who
 "The Fear", by Trust Company from The Lonely Position of Neutral
 "The Fear", a 2018 song by Death Grips from Year of the Snitch
 "The Fear", by GUM from The Underdog

Television
 Fear (TV series), an American paranormal reality television series
 The Fear (1988 TV series), a UK crime drama
 The Fear, a 2001 UK television series featuring Anna Friel
 The Fear (2012 TV series), a British drama series
 "The Fear" (The Twilight Zone), a 1964 episode
 "Fear (Of the Unknown)" (Grey's Anatomy), an episode

Other uses
 FEAR (terrorist group), a 2011–2012 American right-wing terrorist group
 Forfeiture Endangers American Rights, or FEAR, an American activist group opposed to asset forfeiture

See also
 F.E.A.R. (disambiguation)
 
 
 Cape Fear (disambiguation)
 Fears (album), a 1997 album by Atrophia Red Sun
 "Fears" (Modern Family), an episode of the American sitcom Modern Family
 Fears (surname)